Stéphane Pedron (born 20 February 1971) is a French former professional footballer who played as a midfielder.

Career
Pedron was voted 1997–98 French Division 2 Player of the Season after helping Lorient to promotion. 

Pedron retired from football following the expiry of his contract with Lorient after the 2006–07 season. Afterwards, he joined the technical staff of the club alongside Christophe Le Roux.

References

External links
 

1971 births
Living people
People from Redon, Ille-et-Vilaine
Sportspeople from Ille-et-Vilaine
Footballers from Brittany
French footballers
Association football midfielders
Brittany international footballers
Ligue 1 players
Ligue 2 players
Stade Lavallois players
FC Lorient players
AS Saint-Étienne players
RC Lens players
Paris Saint-Germain F.C. players